The Douglas DC-4 is an American four-engined (piston), propeller-driven airliner developed by the Douglas Aircraft Company. Military versions of the plane, the C-54 and R5D, served during World War II, in the Berlin Airlift and into the 1960s. From 1945, many civil airlines operated the DC-4 worldwide.

Design and development
Following proving flights by United Airlines of the DC-4E, it became obvious that the 52-seat airliner was too inefficient and unreliable to operate economically and the partner airlines, American Airlines, Eastern, Pan American, Trans World and United, recommended a lengthy list of changes to the design. Douglas took the new requirements and produced an entirely new, much smaller design, the DC-4A, with a simpler, still unpressurized fuselage, Pratt & Whitney R-2000 Twin Wasp engines, and a single fin and rudder. A tricycle landing gear was retained.

With the entry of the United States into World War II, in December 1941, the United States Army Air Forces took over the provisional orders for the airlines and allocated them  the designation C-54 Skymaster. The first C-54 flew from Clover Field in Santa Monica, California, on 14 February 1942.

To meet military requirements, the first production aircraft had four additional auxiliary fuel tanks in the main cabin, which reduced the passenger seats to 26. The following batch of aircraft was the first built to military specifications, and was designated C-54A and built with a stronger floor and a cargo door with a hoist and winch. The first C-54A was delivered in February 1943. With the introduction of the C-54B in March 1944, the outer wings were changed to hold integral fuel tanks, allowing two of the cabin tanks to be removed; this allowed 49 seats (or 16 stretchers) to be fitted. The C-54C was a hybrid for Presidential use, it had a C-54A fuselage with four cabin fuel tanks and the C-54B wings with built-in tanks to achieve maximum range.

The most common variant was the C-54D, which entered service in August 1944, essentially a C-54B with more powerful R-2000-11 engines. With the C-54E the last two cabin fuel tanks were moved to the wings, which allowed more freight or 44 passenger seats.

In total, 1,163 C-54s (or R5D in US Navy service) were built for the United States military between 1942 and January 1946 and another 79 DC-4s were built after the war. A later variant, with more powerful Merlin engines allowing it to fly over 40% faster, was built in Canada as the Canadair North Star.

Operational history
The DC-4/C-54 proved to be a popular and reliable type, with 1,245 being built between May 1942 and August 1947, including 79 postwar DC-4s. Several remain in service as of 2022.

Douglas continued to develop the type during the war in preparation for a return to airline use when peace returned. Sales of new aircraft had to compete against 500 wartime ex-military C-54s and R5Ds which came onto the civilian market, many of which were converted to DC-4 standard by Douglas. DC-4s were a favorite of charter airlines such as Great Lakes Airlines, North American Airlines, Universal Airlines, and Transocean Airlines. In the 1950s, Transocean (Oakland, California) was the largest civilian C-54/DC-4 operator.

Douglas produced 79 new-build DC-4s between January 1946 and August 9, 1947, the last example being delivered to South African Airways. Pressurization was an option, but all civilian DC-4s (and C-54s) were built unpressurized.

A total of 330 DC-4s and C-54s were used in the Berlin Airlift, which made them one of the most numerous types involved.

Purchasers of new-build DC-4s included Pan American Airways, National Airlines, Northwest Airlines, and Western Airlines in the US, and KLM Royal Dutch Air Lines, Scandinavian Airlines System, Iberia Airlines of Spain, Swissair, Air France, Sabena Belgian World Airlines, Cubana de Aviación, Avianca, Aerolíneas Argentinas, Aeropostal of Venezuela (1946), and South African Airways overseas. Several airlines used new-build DC-4s to start scheduled transatlantic flights between Latin America and Europe. Among the earliest were Aerolíneas Argentinas (1946), Aeropostal of Venezuela (1946), Iberia Airlines of Spain (1946), and Cubana de Aviación (1948).

Basic prices for a new DC-4 in 1946–47 were around £140,000-.

, two DC-4s were used for charters in South Africa by the South African Airways Museum Society, with both aircraft (ZS-BMH and ZS-AUB) carrying historical South African Airways livery.

Buffalo Airways of Yellowknife, Northwest Territories continues to operate the type commercially.

Variants

DC-4
Main production airliner, postwar
Canadair North Star
Canadian production of a Rolls-Royce Merlin-powered variant, plus a single example powered with Pratt & Whitney R-2800s

Aviation Traders Carvair
British cargo and car ferry with a modified nose with a raised cockpit to allow cars to be loaded more easily

Operators

Accidents and incidents

Surviving aircraft

Very few DC-4s remain in service today. 
The last two passenger DC-4s operating worldwide are based in Johannesburg, South Africa. They fly with old South African Airways (SAA) livery. They are ZS-AUB Outeniqua and ZS-BMH Lebombo and are owned by the South African Airways Museum Society and operated by Skyclass Aviation, a company specialising in classic and VIP charters to exotic destinations in Africa.
A 1944-built DC-4/C-54 is on display at Historical Aircraft Restoration Society in New South Wales, Australia, with a planned restoration to airworthiness. 
Buffalo Airways in Canada's Northwest Territories owned 11 DC-4s (former C-54s of various versions), four for hauling cargo and three for aerial firefighting. However, they have all recently been retired in favor of using the Lockheed L-188 Electra for these purposes. All 11 are listed for sale on Buffalo Airways's website.
A 1945-built DC-4 (C-54D) 43-17228 is being operated by Berlin Airlift Historical Foundation as a flying museum of the Berlin Airlift. Called the Spirit of Freedom, it replaced a previous C-54 (44-9144) damaged by a tornado in 2020. 
Alaska Air Fuel also operates two DC4s out of Palmer, Alaska, United States. 
One ex-Buffalo DC-4 (N55CW c/n 10673, currently registered to Aircraft Guaranty Corp Trustee) is fitted with spray bars on top of the wings and is currently based in Florida on standby for oil pollution control.
A 1945-built C-54 (C-54E-5-DO) c/n 27289, USAAF serial 44-9063, was recovered from Reconstruction Finance Corporation by Douglas aircraft for conversion to DC-4.  It served with Pan American World Airways from 1946 to 1952 as NC-88887, then with a succession of carriers and private owners until retired in 1989 as N88887. Around 1990 it was placed on display at the Berlin Airlift Memorial at Frankfurt Airport.

Specifications (DC-4-1009)

See also

Notes

References

Bibliography
 Aro, Chuck. "Talkback". Air Enthusiast, No. 18, April – July 1982. p. 80. .
 Berry, Peter et al. The Douglas DC-4. Tonbridge, Kent, UK: Air-Britain (Historians) Ltd, 1967.
 Blewett, R. Survivors. Coulsden, UK: Aviation Classics, 2007. .
 Francillon, René. McDonnell Douglas Aircraft Since 1920: Volume I. London: Putnam, 1979. .
 Pearcy, Arthur. Douglas Propliners: DC-1–DC-7. Shrewsbury, UK: Airlife Publishing, 1995. .
 Yenne, Bill. McDonnell Douglas: A Tale of Two Giants. Greenwich, Connecticut: Bison Books, 1985. .

External links

 Boeing: Historical Snapshot: DC-4/C-54 Skymaster Transport
 The last DC-4s flying passenger service 
 Vintage Wings of Canada Canadair North Star showing RR Merlin installation
 Life magazine photos by Eliot Elisofon of first production batch of DC-4s being completed (partly outdoors) as military C-54s (note absence of cargo door on these), and including early air-to-air photos of 42-10237 the first DC-4/C-54 to fly
 Popular Mechanics Article about testing prototype DC-4. Incl photo of triple-tail prototype

 
DC-04
1940s United States airliners
Low-wing aircraft
Four-engined tractor aircraft
Aircraft first flown in 1942
Four-engined piston aircraft